Abraham Mitchell is an American former Negro league first baseman who played in the 1930s.

Mitchell played for the Akron Black Tyrites in 1933. In nine recorded games, he posted five hits in 35 plate appearances.

References

External links
 and Seamheads

Year of birth missing
Place of birth missing
Akron Black Tyrites players
Baseball first basemen